On the Edge may refer to:

Books
 On the Edge, a play by Guy Hibbert
 On the Edge, a play about Virginia Woolf by Catherine Ann Jones
On the Edge, novel by Peter Lovesey 1989, filmed as Dead Gorgeous
On the Edge, novel by Gillian Cross
 On the Edge, novel by Edward St Aubyn 
 On the Edge, the first novel in Ilona Andrews' The Edge Series
 On the Edge (Hinton novel), a novel by Nigel Hinton
 On the Edge (Werner novel), the English translation of Am Hang, a 2004 novel by Markus Werner
 On the Edge: Political Cults Right and Left, a nonfiction book by Dennis Tourish and Tim Wohlforth
 On the Edge: The Spectacular Rise and Fall of Commodore, a book by Brian Bagnall about Commodore International

Film
 On the Edge (1986 film), film about the Dipsea Race starring Bruce Dern
 On the Edge (2001 film), 2001 Irish film directed by John Carney
 On the Edge (2001 TV film), film in three parts, directed by Anne Heche, Mary Stuart Masterson, and Helen Mirren
 On the Edge (2002 film), film starring Fred Williamson
 On the Edge (2006 film) (Hak bak do), Hong Kong film starring Nick Cheung
 On the Edge (2011 film), French film
 On the Edge (2020 film), Russian film directed by Eduard Bordukov
 On the Edge (2022 film), Belgian-French-Spanish thriller film

TV
 On the Edge (TV series), a 1991 Hong Kong programme with Alan Chui Chung-San
 On the Edge (UK TV series), a 2008 controversial TV program hosted by Theo Chalmers
  On The Edge (Doc Martin TV Film) 25 December 2006

Music

Albums
 On the Edge (Andy Duguid album)
 On the Edge (The Babys album)
 On the Edge (Iron Fire album)
 On the Edge (Northern Lights album)
 On the Edge (Sea Level album), by Sea Level
 On the Edge, by Jonny Blu
 On the Edge, by Patrick Rondat

Songs
 "On the Edge", by Tokio Hotel from Scream

Other
 On the Edge (game), a collectible card game
 On the Edge (1963) One of the BBC Radio Ballads about teenagers in Britain
 MX vs. ATV: On the Edge, a PlayStation Portable port of the video game MX vs. ATV Unleashed

See also
 Edge (disambiguation)
 Over the Edge (disambiguation)
 The Edge (disambiguation)